The VCU Rams men's soccer team is an intercollegiate varsity sports team of Virginia Commonwealth University, an NCAA Division I member school located in the state's capital of Richmond. The team is a member of the Atlantic 10 Conference.

Since their foundation, the team has won three conference championships, all of which came in the Colonial Athletic Association, and four regular season titles. The Rams have qualified for seven NCAA Division I Men's Soccer Championships, most recently coming in 2012. Most of the team's success has come within the last 15 seasons, as they first reached the NCAA Tournament in 1997. The program's best performance in the tournament came in 2004, when the Rams reached the quarterfinals of the tournament, knocking off the top seed, Wake Forest, in the process.

The Rams are presently coached by David Giffard, who was a former assistant coach under Caleb Porter for the Akron Zips. Under Giffard, the Rams have qualified for three NCAA Tournaments, two as national seeds, and have won one Atlantic 10 Regular Season title. As of 2022, Giffard is the second longest tenured head coach in program history.

History 

Beginning in 1978, Virginia Commonwealth University fielded an NCAA Division I men's varsity soccer program that competed independently, joining the Sun Belt Conference in 1979. Ben Satterfield was the team's initial head coach and was at the helm until the end of the 1982 season. Ben Satterfield's teams got progressively better, and in 1981, was ranked #1 in the Mid-Atlantic Region, and was in the NCAA Division I Top 25 in the nation. VCU had a bye going into the 1981 Sun Belt Tournament with a 12–5–3 record, and lost a heart-breaker to University of South Alabama 2–1, ending their season. Roosevelt Lundy took over in 1983, and struggled to do well in the conference.

Following Steuckenschneider's departure in 1994, Tim Sullivan took over the head coaching job. It was also the same year VCU left the Metro Atlantic Athletic Conference to join the Colonial Athletic Association. Under Sullivan's tenure, the team enjoyed their most success both in conference play and in NCAA play, earning their first ever berth in the NCAA Division I Men's Soccer Championship.

Initially, the young team had struggles in the Colonial Athletic Association, finishing towards the bottom of the conference standings in its first two years. In 1997, the team vastly improved, earning a third-place regular season record and earning the CAA championship that year. In the 1997 Championship, the Rams defeated American University 9–8 in a penalty kick shootout after drawing 2–2 in regulation time.

Since then the team won the CAA championship in 2002 and 2003, as well as winning the regular-season title those same years as well as winning the honor in 2004.

The team's most successful run in the College Cup, the men's NCAA Division I Soccer Tournament, came in 2004, where the Rams entered the tournament as ranked 16th in the nation, earning a bye to the second round proper. In the second round, the Rams defeated George Washington, before upsetting the number-one seeded, Wake Forest Demon Deacons in penalty kicks. Reaching the regional finals, or quarterfinals in the entire tournament, VCU lost to eventual national finalists, the UC Santa Barbara Gauchos.

Following the end of the 2009 season, VCU hit a team nadir, falling to last place in the CAA, their worst in the history. Following the conclusion of the season, 15-year head coach, Tim O'Sullivan was fired to be replaced by David Giffard, thus making Giffard the sixth head coach in VCU men's soccer history. Giffard's facelifting of the team was credited in their finishing as regular season runners-up in 2010.

The Giffard-led program began play in the Atlantic 10 Conference during the 2012 NCAA Division I men's soccer season, where the Rams finished fourth in the Atlantic 10 table, and reached the final of the 2012 Atlantic 10 Men's Soccer Tournament, only to lose to Saint Louis in the final. The Rams secured an at-large bid to the 2012 NCAA Division I Men's Soccer Championship, making it the first time since 2004 the Rams qualified. In the tournament, VCU was seeded fourteenth in the tournament. They lost to Syracuse Orange in the second round proper of the tournament, 3–2 after extra time.

Colors and badge 
The team uses the school colors of black and gold.

Stadium 

Along with the women's soccer and the track & field teams, the Virginia Commonwealth men's soccer team plays at the 3,250-seat Sports Backers Stadium. Located three miles north of the Monroe Park Campus, the stadium is adjacent to The Diamond ballpark, where the baseball team plays. Since its completion in 1999, the stadium has served as the primary venue for the team.

Fans 

Like all VCU Rams sports teams, the men's soccer team's main fan group is the Rowdy Rams. The Rowdy Rams are situated in the bleachers in front of the nets, and switch sides each half to invoke intimidation on the opposing sides goalkeeper. They sit with the university's marching band. The Rowdy Rams at games refer to themselves as Rowdy FC.

Rivalries 

Over the years, the Rams have developed rivalries with intrastate colleges, both in the Colonial Athletic Association and against non-conference opponents. The team's main rivals, at least before the move to the A10, were considered to be George Mason and Old Dominion, who both played with the Rams in the CAA. Due to the recent success of the teams' programs, some considered William & Mary and James Madison to be tertiary conference rivals of the Rams before their departure for the A10.

In the Rams' new conference home of the A10, their main rival will be the Richmond Spiders, primarily due to the geographical proximity of the two universities.

Outside the CAA and A10, some cite Virginia Tech and University of Virginia as intra-conference, state rivals due to record attendances. Of the three largest attendance crowds in VCU soccer history, two came from home matches against VT and UVA.

Roster

Team management

Coaching staff

Head coaching history

Seasons 
This is a list of the most recent seasons at VCU.

Key to conference record
 GP = Games played
 W = Won
 L = Lost
 T = Tied
 GF = Goals for
 GA = Goals against
 Pts = Points
 Pos. = Final conference position

Key to conference tournament rounds
 R1 = First round
 QF = Quarterfinals
 SF = Final
 F = Final

Key to NCAA tournament rounds
 R1 = First round
 R2 = Second round
 R3 = Third round
 R4 = Fourth round
 QF = Quarterfinals
 SF = Semifinals (College Cup)

Source for CAA record: NM Athletics
Source for Metro and Sun Belt record: VCU Athletics

Records and statistics

Attendance records 

 2,927 v. Virginia Tech (Oct 26, 2003)
 2,242 v. Virginia (Sept 25, 2012)
 1,987 v. William & Mary (Oct 12, 2011)

Career records

NCAA tournament results

Honors 
 NCAA Men's Soccer Region 1
 Runners-up (1): 2004
 Atlantic 10 Conference Regular Season
 Winners (1): 2018
 Runners-up (1): 2017
 Atlantic 10 Conference Tournament
 Runners-up (3): 2012, 2015, 2016
 Colonial Athletic Association Tournament
 Champions (3): 1997, 2002, 2003
 Runners-up (2): 1999, 2001
 Colonial Athletic Association Regular Season
 Winners (4): 1998, 2002, 2003, 2004
 Runners-up (2): 1999, 2010
 Metro Conference Regular Season
 Winners (1): 1993

References

External links
 

 
Soccer clubs in Richmond, Virginia
1978 establishments in Virginia
Association football clubs established in 1978